Zayne Emory (born June 3, 1998) is an American actor and singer. He is known for his role as J. C. Spink in the ABC's situation comedy The Goldbergs.

Biography 

Emory was born in McMinnville, Oregon. He developed an interest in acting from an early age. While in elementary school, Emory won a 2007 Gallery Theater Award for Outstanding Youth Debut and a 2008 Oregon State Double Grand Championship at a Youth Focus Talent show. He made his screen debut at the age of eleven in a 2009 episode of Criminal Minds. After that, Emory had roles in other shows like Desperate Housewives, Ghost Whisperer, and CSI: Miami. In 2010, he also joined the cast of the music comedy show I'm in the Band in the role of Charles "Chucky" Albertson. Emory earned the Young Artist Award in 2011 and 2012 for the role. He was also nominated for his role in Shake It Up and A.N.T. Farm in 2014.

Aside from TV, Emory has also appeared in several feature films. He made his film debut in 2011 in the romantic comedy Crazy, Stupid, Love, starring Steve Carell, Ryan Gosling, and Julianne Moore. After that, he has appeared in other films like Little Loopers and Maximum Ride. Since 2016, Emory has had several recurring roles in shows like 24: Legacy, Supergirl, Runaways, Crazy Ex-Girlfriend, and The Rookie. In 2015, he was cast as J. C. Spink, replacing Cooper Roth, for the second season of ABC's situation comedy The Goldbergs.

Filmography

Film

Television

Awards and nominations

References

External links
 

1998 births
American male child actors
Living people
People from McMinnville, Oregon
Male actors from Oregon